Azat may refer to:

 Azat, a class of Armenian nobility
 Azat Republican Party of Kazakhstan
 Azat (river) in Armenia
 Azat, Armenia, a village in Gegharkunik province, Armenia
 Azad, Azerbaijan (disambiguation), multiple villages of that name
 Azat, Kazakhstan
 Azat-Châtenet, Creuse, France
 Azat-le-Ris, Haute-Vienne, France

See also
 Azad (disambiguation)